The Petit Combin is a mountain of the Swiss Pennine Alps, located between the valleys of Entremont and Bagnes in the canton of Valais. It belongs to the Grand Combin massif.

The Petit Combin is a popular destination for heliskiing and snow landing.

References

External links
Petit Combin on Hikr

Mountains of the Alps
Alpine three-thousanders
Mountains of Switzerland
Mountains of Valais
Bagnes